Yomiuriland (よみうりランド, Yomiurirando) is an amusement park in Inagi, Tokyo, Japan that first opened in 1964. It is situated on hillsides, and features rides such as roller coasters and water flumes. It is home to Yomiuri Giants Stadium, one of the training fields for the Yomiuri Giants baseball team, and was the primary training ground before Tokyo Dome was completed. It is operated and run by the Yomiuri Group, the parent of media conglomerate Yomiuri Shimbun.  A bath house was constructed to attract more senior citizens.

Entrance fees are 1800 yen for adults, 800 yen for children and seniors aged 60 over.

One-day pass (entrance + sea lion show + free pass for attractions) is ¥5,400 for adults, ¥4,500 for seniors (Age 65 and above).

Access
It can be accessed by two train stations, Keio Sagamihara Line's Keiō-Yomiuriland Station or Yomiuriland-mae Station of Odakyu.

Attractions
Yomiuriland has 44 attractions from thrilling rides to family-friendly rides. Yomiuriland also has about 1,000 cherry blossoms during the spring. During the summer (usually from June 30 - September 9), visitors can enjoy Pool WAI (Water Amusement Island), a water park for an additional fee. Jewellimunation lights up the park with a massive LED display inspired by gemstone colors. These attraction each contain their own unique atmosphere and diversity in rides. There are also many shops and food courts around the park.

Roller coasters

Operating
 Bandit
 Space Factory
 Spin Runway
 Wan Wan Coaster Wandit

Defunct
 SL Coaster
 White Canyon
 Twist Coaster Robin
 Momonga Standing and Loop Coaster

References

External links
 Yomiuriland website in English

Amusement parks in Japan
Buildings and structures in Tokyo
Tourist attractions in Tokyo
1964 establishments in Japan
Amusement parks opened in 1964
Inagi, Tokyo
Keio Corporation